is a Japanese road bicycle racer, who currently rides for UCI WorldTeam .

Career
Born in Ishigaki, Okinawa Prefecture, Arashiro was the Japanese Under-23 National Time Trial and Road Race Champion in 2005. He has also won the Japanese National Road Race Championships three times, in 2007, 2013 and 2022.

In 2009 he was selected by his team to ride the Tour de France. Along with Fumiyuki Beppu, he was the first Japanese national to complete that race, as on prior occasions Kisso Kawamuro and Daisuke Imanaka had started, but not finished, the race. By finishing the 2010 Giro d'Italia, he became the first Japanese person to finish two Grand Tour events. He recorded a third-place stage finish on the fifth stage, behind breakaway companions Jérôme Pineau and Julien Fouchard. He completed his third Tour de France in 2012 in 84th place—the highest placing of a Japanese person at that time—and earned the most combative award on Stage 4.  He participated in the men's road race at the 2012 Summer Olympics and finished in 48th place. A few weeks after the Olympics, he became the first Japanese to win a race categorized as HC by the UCI, the Tour du Limousin of the Palais des Sports de Beaublanc in Limoges. Competing in the 2015 Vuelta a España, he became the first Japanese person to finish the three Grand Tours. He finished 27th in the 2016 Summer Olympics men's road race, and 35th in the 2020 Summer Olympics men's road race.

Arashiro has completed all fifteen Grand Tours that he has started, with a best finish of 65th at the 2014 Tour de France and the 2015 Vuelta a España.

Major results

2005
 National Under-23 Road Championships
1st  Time trial
1st  Road race
 9th Tour de Okinawa
2006
 3rd Overall Tour du Limousin
 3rd Tour de Okinawa
2007
 1st  Road race, National Road Championships
 1st Stage 7 Tour of Japan
 2nd Overall Vuelta Ciclista a León
1st Mountains classification
 2nd Tour du Jura
 3rd Overall Tour de Hokkaido
1st Stage 4
 3rd Tour de Okinawa
 5th Japan Cup
 7th Tour du Finistère
2008
 1st Overall Tour de Okinawa
1st Stages 1 & 2
 Asian Road Championships
3rd  Time trial
10th Road race
 3rd Overall Tour du Limousin
1st Stage 2
 3rd Overall Tour de Kumano
1st Stage 2
 5th Overall Tour of Japan
 7th Overall Les 3 Jours de Vaucluse
 7th Overall Tour de Bretagne
2009
 9th Overall Four Days of Dunkirk
 10th Trophée des Grimpeurs
 10th Grand Prix de Denain
2010
 1st Critérium cycliste international de Quillan
 5th Paris–Tours
 7th Grand Prix de la Somme
 9th Road race, UCI Road World Championships
 9th Val d'Ille Classic
 9th Japan Cup
2011
 Asian Road Championships
1st  Road race
4th Time trial
 2nd Road race, National Road Championships
 5th Overall Paris–Corrèze
 10th Overall Tour du Limousin
2012
 1st  Overall Tour du Limousin
  Combativity award Stage 4 Tour de France
2013
 1st  Road race, National Road Championships
 2nd Overall Tour du Limousin
2014
 10th Amstel Gold Race
2015
 3rd Japan Cup
 5th Paris–Camembert
 6th Cholet-Pays de Loire
 10th Road race, Asian Road Championships
2016
 1st Stage 7 Tour of Japan
 2nd  Road race, Asian Road Championships
 9th Japan Cup
  Combativity award Stage 6 Tour de France
2017
 Asian Road Championships
2nd  Team time trial
7th Road race
 3rd Hong Kong Challenge
2018
 Asian Road Championships
1st  Team time trial
5th Road race
 1st  Overall Tour de Taiwan
2019
 2nd Road race, National Road Championships
2022
 National Road Championships
1st  Road race
3rd Time trial

Grand Tour general classification results timeline

References

External links

Europcar Profile
CyclingNews Profile
Tour De France Profile

Japanese male cyclists
1984 births
Living people
People from Okinawa Prefecture
Cyclists at the 2012 Summer Olympics
Cyclists at the 2016 Summer Olympics
Cyclists at the 2020 Summer Olympics
Olympic cyclists of Japan